Billy Sven Forsberg (born 13 May 1988) is a Swedish speedway rider who represented the Belle Vue Aces in the British Elite League before his premature retirement at the end of the 2009 following injury. He appeared in a SGP as a wildcard.

Family
His grandfather Dan Forsberg rode for Birmingham Brummies and reached two World finals in 1952 and 1957.

References 

1988 births
Living people
Swedish speedway riders
Belle Vue Aces riders
Sportspeople from Norrköping